Mabamba is an administrative ward within Muhambwe Constituency in Kibondo District of Kigoma Region in Tanzania. 

In 2016 the Tanzania National Bureau of Statistics report there were 19,351 people in the ward, from 17,580 in 2012.

References

Kibondo District
Wards of Kigoma Region
Constituencies of Tanzania